Legislature of Singapore can refer to the:

Legislative Assembly of Singapore (1955–1965)
Parliament of Singapore (1965–present)